The spotbanded scat,(Selenotoca multifasciata), also known as the  striped scat, banded scat, barred scat, butterfish, John Dory, Johnny Dory, old maid, Southern butter-fish or striped butterfish, is a species of ray-finned fish, belonging to the family Scatophagidae, the scats. They are found in the eastern Indian Ocean and southwestern Pacific Ocean.

Taxonomy
The spotbanded scat was first formally described in 1846 as Scatophagus multifasciatus by the  Scottish naval surgeon, naturalist and arctic explorer Sir John Richardson with the type locality given as King George Sound in Western Australia, although this is several hundred kilometres from its known range and is probably an error on the type specimen's label and the type locality should be farther north, and the description was published in the Ichthyology of the voyage of H.M.S. Erebus & Terror. In 1936 the American ichthyologist George S. Myers reclassified Scatophagus multifasciatus in to a new monotypic genus Selenotoca. In 1938, the British ichthyologist Alec Fraser-Brunner described a second species for the genus Selenotoca papuensis from New Guinea but Catalog of Fishes states that this taxon is a synonym of S. multiasciatus, although FishBase lists it as a valid species.

The genus name Selenotoca is a compound of selene meaning "moon" and tokos which means "offspring", the compound word meaning "born of the moon", Myers did not explain the allusion nor is it clear. The specific name means multifasciatus "many banded", a reference to the dark vertical bars on the back and upper flanks of this species.

Description
The spotbanded scat has a deep, compressed body covered in vert small ctenoid scales. They have a steep dorsal profile to the head, a moderately large eye which has a diameter which is markedly shorter than the length of the rounded snout length. The small, horizontal mouth is not protractile  and there are several rows of bristle like teeth on the jaws. The dorsal fin has 7-12 spines and 16 soft rays while the anal fin has 4 spines and 15-16 soft rays. The first spine in the dorsal fin lies flat and there is a deep incision between spiny and soft rayed parts of the dorsal fin. The caudal fin is rounded in juveniles and truncate in adults. The rear margins of  the soft rayed parts of the dorsal and anal fins is diagonal. The background colour of this species is greenish or silvery with many dark, vertical bars on the upper flanks and spots, typically smaller than eye, arranged in roughly vertical rows on the lower flanks. The lips are black.

Distribution and habitat
The spotbanded scat is found from Sulawesi and Papua in eastern Indonesia  Papua New Guinea, New Caledonia and northern and eastern Australia. In Australia this species' range extends from Shark Bay in Western Australia along the northern coasts to Sydney in New South Wales. They inhabit brackish mangrove estuaries and coastal freshwater .

Biology
The spotbanded scat form schools over sandy areas in estuaries and in river mouths. It is an omnivore which feeds on small benthic invertebrates and detritus. There is a venom gland at the base of each spine and a painful wound can be caused if the spines puncture the skin when handling this fish.

Utilisation
The spotbanded scat is targeted by recreation anglers. Juveniles are collected for the aquarium trade.

References

Scatophagidae
Fish described in 1846
:Category:Taxa named by John Richardson (naturalist)